John Hick is an English male international lawn bowler.

Bowls career
Hick became an English national champion in 2008 after winning fours title at the English National Bowls Championships.

He won the triples gold medal at the Atlantic Bowls Championships in 2011.

References

Living people
English male bowls players
Year of birth missing (living people)